The 2004 FIU Golden Panthers football team represented Florida International University in the 2004 NCAA Division I-AA football season. The Panthers were led by head coach Don Strock in his third season and finished with a record of zero wins and seven losses (0–7). In 2008, the NCAA Division I Committee on Infractions found major violations within the football program and as such vacated the Panthers' three wins from the 2004 season.

Schedule

References

FIU
FIU Panthers football seasons
College football winless seasons
FIU Golden Panthers football